The California Department of Housing and Community Development (HCD) is a department within the California Business, Consumer Services and Housing Agency that develops housing policy and building codes (i.e. the California Building Standards Code), regulates manufactured homes and mobilehome parks, and administers housing finance, economic development and community development programs.

The HCD Housing Assistance Program (HAP) acts as the local housing authority for 12 rural counties: Alpine, Amador, Calaveras, Colusa, Glenn, Inyo, Modoc, Mono, Sierra, Siskiyou, Trinity, and Tuolumne. One of the primary purposes of housing authorities is to manage Section 8 housing, but other activities include Community Development Block Grant (CDBG) entitlements and HOME Investment Partnerships Program (HOME) funding. The HCD has administered CDBG program for non-entitlement cities and counties (cities and counties under a specified population level that do not automatically receive CDBG funds directly from the federal government) since 1983, and administers HOME funding for cities and counties that do not receive HOME allocations directly from the federal government since the Cranston-Gonzalez National Affordable Housing Act of 1990.

History
The HCD was created on 17 September 1965. The Zenovich–Moscone–Chacon Housing and Home Finance Act of 1975 permanently established and reorganized the HCD, as well as created the California Housing Finance Agency. It inherited the housing portion of the Division of Immigration and Housing of the Californian Department of Industrial Relations.

See also 
 United States Department of Housing and Urban Development
 California Housing Finance Agency

References

External links
 
 Housing and Community Development in the California Code of Regulations

Housing and Community Development Department
Housing and Community Development